Celeste Johnson (born 1959 in Chicago, Illinois), also known as Celeste, is an American-born, Italian-based athlete, model, singer and TV host. 

Before entering the showbusiness, Johnson was a professional long jump athlete. She started her career in show business as a model when she was discovered by producer Claudio Cecchetto in Milan. In 1983 she released her first single, Love & musica.

In 1984 she was a regular guest on TV shows like Sponsor City (Rete 4 and Premiatissima (Canale 5). In 1985 she released her first album, Celeste. One of the songs from the album, "Lascia che sia", was released as a single and topped the Italian charts for five weeks. The same year Celeste performed at Festivalbar.

In 1986 she released her second album, Blue.

In 1987 she recorded "Hot Girl", a duet with Italo disco Star Sabrina Salerno.

In 1991 she switched to the DDD Label and recorded her fourth album, The Swing of Love.

Discography 
 Celeste (Five Records, 1985)
 Blue (Five Records, 1985)
 The Seventh Wind (Five Records, 1989)
 The Swing of Love (DDD, 1991)

References

Further reading 
 Gino Castaldo (ed.), Dizionario della canzone italiana, Curcio, 1990 (entry about Celeste by Dario Salvatori), p. 341.  (Italian)
 Celeste, una voce come sigla, Corriere della Sera, 20 August 1993, p. 33. (Italian)

1959 births
People from Chicago
American expatriates in Italy
Living people
21st-century American politicians
Italian pop singers
Italian Italo disco musicians